Angelit, formerly known as Angelin tytöt (Aŋŋel nieiddat), is a Finnish Sámi folk music group formed by sisters Ursula and Tuuni Länsman in 1989. However, the history of the group can be traced back to 1982 when Eino Ukkonen, Ursula and Tuuni Länsman's Finnish teacher, took them along with some classmates to sing at a Sámi festival held at Utsjoki. In 1987 the group released their first non-commercial tape, recorded together with Mari Boine.

In 1989 one of the members of the group was killed in a car accident, and subsequently the group broke up. Together with Ulla Pirttijärvi, Ursula and Tuuni went on and established a group that was called "Angelin tytöt" or "girls of Angeli", named after Angeli, the village they grew up in, located in Inari in Northern Finland. Ulla sings in their first album "Dolla" and has made a successful solo career after leaving the group.

The group changed its name to Angelit in 1997 due to the problem of many different translations of "Angelin tytöt".

Members

 Tuuni Länsman (vocals)
 Ursula Länsman (vocals)
 Alfred Häkkinen (joined in 1994; guitar and drums)
 Samuli Kosminen (joined in 1999; percussion)
 Mamba Assefa (joined in 1999; percussion)
 Kimmo Kajasto (joined in 1999; keyboards, programming, atmospherics)

Former members

 Ulla Pirttijärvi (vocals)
 Jonne Järvelä (from Korpiklaani)

Discography

Albums

As Angelin tytöt:

 Dolla (Fire, 1992)
 Giitu (Thank you, 1993)
 Skeaikit (Laughter, 1995)
 The Voice of the North (1997) - a compilation of the three previous albums

As Angelit:

 Mánnu (The moon, 1999)
 Reasons (2003)

Collaborations

All but the Final Fantasy collaboration have been made with the band Waltari.

 Final Fantasy V Dear Friends (1993)
 So Fine! (1994)
 So Fine 2000 (2000)
 Channel Nordica (2000)

References

External links
 Official website
 Angelin Tytöt - "Giddat" (1990)

Sámi musical groups
Finnish world music groups
Musical groups established in 1989